Khodzhayev, Khodzhaev, Khojayev or Khojaev (Uzbek: Xo‘jayev; Russian: Ходжаев) is an Asian masculine surname, its feminine counterpart is Khodzhayeva, Khodzhaeva, Khojaeva or Khojaeva. It may refer to
Fayzulla Khodzhayev (1896–1938), Uzbekistani politician
Mo'ina Khojaeva (born 1941), Uzbekistani Tajik poet and short story writer
Rustam Khojayev (born 1973), Tajikistani footballer
Sukhrob Khodzhayev (born 1993), Uzbekistani Olympic hammer thrower

Uzbek-language surnames
Tajik-language surnames